Nicolai Oppen Larsen (born 9 March 1991) is a Danish professional footballer who plays for Silkeborg IF.

Beginning his career in Lyngby Boldklub, Larsen moved to AaB in 2010. There, he established himself as a starter and was part of a historical season where AaB won the Danish Double, as they secured the Danish Superliga and the Danish Cup in the 2013–14 season. He also experienced personal success at the club, winning the Danish Goalkeeper of the Year award for 2014. After seven years at AaB, Larsen moved to Nordsjælland in 2017. He would initially struggle to make the team, but eventually became the starting goalkeeper. In 2020, at age 29, he earned a move to French club Guingamp, but returned to Denmark after one season, signing with Silkeborg.

Larsen is a Danish youth international, and has gained 37 caps for different national youth teams between under-16 and under-21 level. In 2014, he received a call-up for the Denmark national team, but failed to make an appearance.

Club career

Lyngby 
Larsen played for Lyngby Boldklub from 2005, whom he moved to from the youth academy of Herlev IF. He never made a senior appearance for Lyngby, but gained several caps for Danish national youth teams during his time at the club. While at Lyngby, Larsen went on trials abroad, among others with English club Everton. He moved away from Lyngby Boldklub in 2010.

AaB

2010–2012 
On 15 June 2010, ahead of the 2010–11 season, AaB signed Larsen on a two-year contract. Then director of sports in AaB, Lynge Jakobsen stated in the club's press release that "Nicolai is young, but has the potential to become a Superliga goalkeeper, and with us he will, among other things, through daily practice with Karim Zaza and our goalkeeping coach Poul Buus have the opportunity to continue his development". Upon his arrival at AaB, he became the backup to starting goalkeeper, Karim Zaza, who played in AaB for four years, between 2007 and 2011.

Larsen made his debut for AaB as a 20-year-old when he started in an away match against Brøndby IF on 17 July 2011. His first senior appearance ended in a 2–2 draw, where he played the full 90 minutes. Larsen was considered the starting goalkeeper in the 2011–12 season, his second at AaB, after Zaza's contract with the club was not extended, despite the club being saved from relegation on the last day of play in the regular season. Addressing Larsen's debut, Kent Nielsen, AaB's head coach, stated that "we [AaB] are therefore full of confidence and feel safe starting him, just as we are sure that he can also tackle the adversity that will come, sooner or later." Carsten Christensen was brought in as a backup for Larsen in the summer of 2011, leading up to his debut season. In his debut season, Larsen made 32 appearances out of 33 possible in the Superliga. He received two warnings during the season. At the age of 20, Larsen signed a four-year contract extension with AaB keeping him a part of the club from Aalborg until 2015. He signed the contract at a point, where he had made 17 official first-team appearances for AaB.

2012–2014 
The following season also saw him as the starting goalkeeper for AaB. He played all 33 matches from start, and also played a full 90 minutes in them all. At the end of the season, Larsen had played 2970 minutes in total in the 2012–13 season, as AaB finished in 5th place.

In the 2013–14 Danish Superliga season, his third season as the club's starting goalkeeper, he made 32 out of 33 possible appearances in the league, playing full time in all 32 matches. In these 32 matches, Larsen also incurred one single warning in a match against Randers FC on 11 November 2013, which resulted in him receiving three suspension points. In December 2013, he was voted second in Danish Goalkeeper of the Year awards by his fellow Superliga and 1st Division (second-tier) goalkeepers for 2013. Larsen signed a four-year contract extension on 2 May 2014, keeping him at the club until 30 June 2018. AaB would go on to win their fourth Danish championship in the 2013–14 season. The title was secured on 11 May 2014, where AaB drew 0–0 away against FC Vestsjælland, as FC Midtjylland lost 3–2 to Copenhagen, which effectively made the club from Aalborg Danish champions. AaB also won the Danish Cup this year, defeating Copenhagen in the final on 15 May 2014 to secure the Danish Double.

To kick off the new season, Larsen appeared in two UEFA Europa League qualifiers on 18 and 26 July 2014 against Georgian club Dila Gori, where AaB lost 3–0 on aggregate.

On 26 December 2014, it was announced that Larsen had won the Danish Goalkeeper of the Year award of 2014. It had originally been planned that the award should have been presented to Larsen prior to the match against Brøndby IF on 22 February 2015 by Troels Bager Thøgersen, editor-in-chief of Tipsbladet, but Larsen had to postpone in the last minute due to illness, and therefore the award was presented to him at the match against Randers FC on 8 March 2015. Larsen received 58 out of 72 possible votes from his goalkeeper colleagues, while second-place in the competition, Karl-Johan Johnsson from Randers FC, received 34 votes. On winning the award, Larsen stated that "[t]his is one of the big ones. It is a personal title, and it makes it is awesome that my competitors and colleagues are the ones who vote [...]" and he continued "[t]his is one of those awards I will look back on and be proud of[...]".

Nordsjælland 
On 31 August 2017, the last day of the summer transfer window, Larsen moved to Superliga club FC Nordsjælland. He was brought in to supplement starting goalkeeper Rúnar Alex Rúnarsson. He made his official debut for the club in the 2017–18 Danish Cup 3rd round matchup against Vejgaard BK, where Larsen kept a clean sheet, as Nordsjælland won 4–0 on Soffy Road. He would, however, not make his Superliga debut for Nordsjælland in his first season at the club, as Rúnarsson played all 36 matches.

Runarsson was sold to French club Dijon FCO in June 2018, and in early July 2018, Nordsjælland brought in Nigel Bertrams from Dutch side NAC Breda. Thus, Larsen had to compete with Bertrams and Peter Vindahl Jensen for a starting job. However, Larsen initially took over the position as first goalkeeper, who among other made his European debut for the club in the UEFA Europa League qualification against Northern Irish club Cliftonville on 12 July 2018 and started in the following five matches in the tournament, until the club was knocked out of the tournament to Serbian side FK Partizan over two legs. In particular Larsen was praised for his performances in the first leg of the second round qualifier against Swedish club AIK, where he, among other things, saved a penalty kick. He made his debut in the Superliga for Nordsjælland on 15 July 2018 in a match against Esbjerg fB, which ended 1–1.

Guingamp 
On 25 June 2020, after three years at Nordsjælland, Larsen was signed by French club En Avant Guingamp on a two-year contract. He officially joined the club on 12 July. Larsen made his debut for the club on 22 August in a 1–0 home loss to Chamois Niortais. He was benched after Guingamp experienced a poor start to the season. In late October, he tested positive for SARS-CoV-2 together with teammate Matthias Phaeton.

Silkeborg
On 23 June 2021, it was announced that Larsen had signed a two-year contract with newly promoted Danish Superliga club Silkeborg IF. He made his debut on 19 July – the first matchday of the 2021–22 Danish Superliga – keeping a clean sheet in a 0–0 home draw against SønderjyskE. He remained the starting goalkeeper for Silkeborg through the fall and recorded strong performances.

International career 

Larsen has appeared for all Danish national youth teams throughout his career. He gained most caps for the Denmark under-19 team. Larsen made his debut when he participated in a national youth match against Portugal under-16 on 10 April 2007 in Castelo Branco, Portugal with Glen Riddersholm as coach. His debut for the under-16 team ended in a 2–2 draw. He has gained 37 caps for various national youth teams between under-16 and under-21 level, but has not yet won an appearance for the Danish national football team.

Larsen received his first call-up for the Danish national team on 26 August 2014, where he and his teammate Rasmus Würtz were selected to play the friendly match against Turkey on 3 September 2014, played at TREFOR Park in Odense, and against Armenia in the UEFA Euro 2016 qualifiers on 7 September 2014. In the match against Turkey, Larsen did not make an appearance as Denmark lost 2–1 on goals by Ozan Tufan and Olcay Şahan. He also did not appear in the qualifying match against Armenia, where Kasper Schmeichel was preferred as a starter the match.

Personal life 
Both his father and his grandfather have made appearances and scored goals for the Denmark national team. His father and grandfather are named Carsten Larsen and Benno Larsen, respectively. Benno Larsen was born on 30 September 1949. He started his professional career in B 1903 in 1969, where he played until 1971. Benno Larsen won 16 national team caps and played in his active career in clubs such as FC St. Pauli, GAIS and FC Augsburg. He participated in the famous away game in Gothenburg, where Denmark won 2–1 in 1976; a place where Denmark had not won a match since 1937. In addition to his 16 caps, he also played 21 matches for the Denmark under-21 team. Benno Larsen became coach of Helsingør IF seniors in 2012.

Carsten Larsen was born on 5 September 1968. He gained three caps for Denmark under-17. He made his international debut on 29 July 1986 in a match against Iceland in Akureyri, Iceland in an inter-Nordic tournament. Carsten Larsen has been described as a responsive goalkeeper with good hands, but stopped prematurely in 1999 after a series of serious cruciate ligament injuries. In 1986, Carsten Larsen received the KB Fodbold Granen, which is awarded each year by Kjøbenhavns Boldklub (KB)'s board to the club's U17 or U19 player.

Honours
AaB
Danish Superliga: 2013–14
Danish Cup: 2013–14

Individual
Danish Goalkeeper of the Year: 2014

References

External links

National team profile at dbu.dk 
EA Guingamp profile at eaguingamp.com 

1991 births
Living people
People from Herlev Municipality
Association football goalkeepers
Danish men's footballers
Danish Superliga players
Ligue 2 players
Lyngby Boldklub players
AaB Fodbold players
FC Nordsjælland players
En Avant Guingamp players
Silkeborg IF players
Denmark under-21 international footballers
Danish expatriate men's footballers
Expatriate footballers in France
Danish expatriate sportspeople in France
Herlev IF players
Sportspeople from the Capital Region of Denmark